Palmers Green United Reformed Church is a united reformed church in Fox Lane, Palmers Green, north London.

References

External links 

Palmers Green
United Reformed churches in London
Churches in the London Borough of Enfield